The Dark Crusader is a 1961 thriller novel by Scottish author Alistair MacLean. The book was initially published under the pseudonym Ian Stuart and later under his true name. It was released in the United States under the title: The Black Shrike.

MacLean wrote it in part to prove he could have success writing under a new name.

Plot
Eight top-level scientists and their wives disappear after responding to newspaper advertisements for specialists in different areas of modern technology, so when a ninth advertisement appears, Agent John Bentall is recalled to London from a mission in Turkey by his superior, Colonel Raine. The advertisements offered high rates of pay to applicants who were married, had no children and were prepared for immediate travel. Bentall, a physicist who specialized in solid rocket fuels and is presently working for the British government on counter espionage, is paired with Marie Hopeman, a secret agent posted in the same job as Bentall in Turkey, assigned to pose as his wife. All eight scientists had disappeared in Australia or en route there, and Bentall and Hopeman find themselves kidnapped at a hotel in Fiji. They escaped from the kidnappers to the island of Vardu, a remote coral atoll in the middle of the Pacific Ocean, which is currently home to Professor Witherspoon, a noted archaeologist. The island has no radio transmitter and the next boat is scheduled to arrive in three weeks. Bentall finds Dr. Witherspoon somewhat sketchy. Later, Bentall discovers Witherspoon is actually LeClerc, the mastermind behind a plot to steal a British missile, the Dark Crusader and send it to Australia for nefarious purposes.

Bentall's character displays a stumbling, self-deprecating demeanour and makes mistakes that lead to the pair falling into the trap set by the villains. The story becomes more complicated when Bentall and Hopeman find themselves falling in love as they try to defeat LeClerc. Neither the female secret agent nor the situation are quite as they seem. In the end  Bentall chooses between saving  Hopeman and preventing the theft of the missile, and finally unravels the last details of the plot with his boss, Colonel Raine back in London.

Reception
The book did not sell as well as earlier MacLean titles and was later reissued under MacLean's name. Film rights were bought by Simon Lewis in 1991 but no movie resulted.

References

External links
 Book review at AlistairMacLean.com

Novels by Alistair MacLean
1961 British novels
British spy novels
Works published under a pseudonym
Novels set on islands
William Collins, Sons books
Novels set in Oceania